Qambar Shahdadkot District is a district of Sindh, Pakistan, originally named after Shahdad Khan Khuhawar the official founder.  District Qambar Shahdadkot, with headquarters at Qambar, was established on 13 December 2004.

Taluka Qambar and Shahdadkot Tehsil were part of Larkana district since long before they were combined and made one district for administrative purposes. At first it was named only Qambar but because of dissent from the people of Shahdadkot city, the name Shahdadkot was added. Today, however, the locals of Shahdadkot demand a separate district comprising Shahdadkot, Qubo Saeed Khan and Sijawal Junejo as they face difficulties in governmental work because they must go a long distance to Qambar to get the work done because most government offices are there. The district was created in the tenure of Chief Minister Arbab Ghulam Rahim, who is accused of creating this district for political gains and to weaken the stronghold of Pakistan People's Party in the area because Shahdadkot has been the electoral constituency for Shaheed Benazir Bhutto. The creation of the district benefited family, who are the landlords of Qambar Shahdadkot. In 2005, Nawab Shabbir Khan Chandio became the first elected nazim of the newly created district.

History
The district was split from Larkana District in December 2005. There was some controversy over the name of the district, with Qambar being favoured initially, but after protests from residents of Shahdadkot, it was renamed to Qambar-Shahdadkot District. The headquarters of the district is Qambar city.

Administrative divisions
The total area of District Qambar Shahdadkot is 1453383 acres. The district is divided into seven tehsils: Qambar, Miro Khan, Shahdadkot, Warah, Sija Wal Junejo, Nasirabad and Qubo Saeed Khan. Taluka Qambar has the largest area, 522,462 acres. District Council Qambar Shahdadkot has 52 union councils, two municipal committees and seven town committees.

 Qambar Tehsil
 Shahdadkot Tehsil
 Warah Tehsil
 Mirokhan Tehsil
 Nasirabad Tehsil
 Qubo Saeed Khan Tehsil
 Sijawal Junejo Tehsil

The district government comprises seven groups of offices i.e. health, education, works and services, finance and planning, community development, revenue and agriculture besides district administration comprising a District Nazim (mayor), Naib Nazim (deputy mayor) and District Coordination Officer.

Education
According to a survey conducted by Sindh Education Management Information System in 2010–2011, there are 377 schools for boys, 306 schools for girls, and 997 co-ed schools. The boys' schools enroll 7538 students, and the girls' schools enroll 33,061. The total number of all enrolled students is 195,774. The total number of teachers in the district is 4239, of whom, 3411 are male and 828 are female. The student to teacher ratio is 46. The number of functional schools in urban areas is 91, and in rural areas it is 1439. The total number of closed schools in the district is 150. The total number of schools in Qambar Shahdadkot is 1680.

Geography

Qambar Shahdakot shares its borders with three districts of Balochistan on the west, Khuzdar, Jaffarabad and Jhal Magsi. Its southern borders are connected with district Dadu. District Larkana is on the east and district Jacobabad is on the north.

The district has a variety of features with its vast plains, agricultural land, the mighty mountain range of Kirthar and a number of wetlands including Hamal, Drigh and Langh lakes. The Khirthar extends southward for almost 300 km from the Mula River in east-central Balochistan to Cape Muari (Monze) west of Karachi on the Arabian Sea. Khirthar in Sindhi means 'milk-cream', which is contrary to the environment of the place. It is a range of limestone hills and mountains which is referred to as Hallar by the old writers, but it is commonly known as Kirthar today.

The Khirthar range also has a national park, which is the second largest wildlife park in the area. It is located between Karachi and Balochistan. This area is covered with limestone hills which rise from 4000 to nearly 8000 feet and are surrounded by the fossilized remnants of different times of history.

The inhabitants of the region are chiefly Balochi and Sindhi who belong to Brahui tribe and they survive by flock graze. Chhuttas of Balochistan, Chandios and Gainchos of Sindh also live in this area.

Rare species of animals are found in Khirthar National Park, including the Sindh wild goat, Indian fox, Egyptian vulture, Indian pangolin, desert wolf, Chinkara gazelle, honey badger, jackal, Asiatic leopard, Bonnelli's eagle, striped hyena, jungle cat, and a number of reptile and bird species.

Demographics
At the time of the 2017 census, Qambar Shahdadkot district had a population of 1,338,035, of which 680,567 were males and 657,290 females. The rural population was 941,232 (70.34%) and urban 396,803 (29.66%). The literacy rate is 38.08%: 48.59% for males and 27.28% for females.

The majority religion is Islam, with 99.21% of the population. Hinduism (including those from Scheduled Castes) is practiced by 0.74% of the population.

At the time of the 2017 census, 90.00% of the population spoke Sindhi and 8.00% Brahui as their first language.

Industry
The Shahdadkot Textile Mills was situated in the north of Shahdadkot City. It employed around 4,500 workers in the district which was previously part of Larkana. The mill was established in 1974 under the orders of Zulfikar Ali Bhutto, then prime minister of Pakistan. Iran had assisted Pakistan for the installation of the mill in Shahdadkot. The mill was started in 1978 and became the source of livelihood of many people living in all four provinces. The cloth from here was sent to Punjab for sale. The mill produced export quality cloth.

Due to political problems after Zulfikar Ali Bhutto's time and financial crisis to the mill, it could not pay salaries to its 4000 workers and this led to the downfall of the mill during Zia's regime. When Benazir Bhutto returned to the government in 1990, the mill again started to produce fine polyester productions of various designs. Abdul Fatah Bhatti, funded by Nisar Memon, a contractor from Karachi, was given complete authorization to operate in the mills. He even expelled the few remaining workers from the Mills and put up a notice of shutting down of the mills on July 8, 2007. Because of political and economic crisis, the mills and the industry in the district suffered and its infrastructure was sold for a petty amount. Now it wears a deserted look.

The present small industries are as follows: electronic goods, agricultural tools, construction material and food processing through bakeries and shops. The cottage industry of embroidery caps particularly in Shahdadkot Taluka has a good market in the district as well as outside the district.

List of Dehs
The following is a list of Qambar Shahdadkot District's dehs, organised by Tehsils:

 Qambar Tehsil (105 Dehs)
 Abra
 Acha
 Aheer
 Bagh Jagir
 Bagodero
 Ber
 Bhada
 Bhangar Acha
 Bharmi
 Bhola Kalhora
 Boohar
 Chacha
 Chhajra
 Changro
 Dera
 Dhero
 Dost Ali
 Drib Mitho
 Duwabo
 Elchi
 Esso
 F. M. Siyal
 Fatoohal Wah
 Ghathar
 Ghogharo
 Hani
 Hasula
 Hulia
 Jagir No. 1
 Jagir No. 2
 Jagir No. 3
 Jagir No. 4
 Jagir No. 5
 Jagir No. 6
 Jagir No. 6 Chak No. 2
 Jagir No. 6 Chak No. 3
 Jagir No. 6 Chak No. 4
 Jagir No. 6 Chak No. 5
 Jagir No. 6 Chak No. 6
 Jagir No. 6 Chak No. 7
 Jagir No. 6 Chak No. 8
 Jagir No. 6 Chak No. 9
 Jagir No. 6 Chak No. 10
 Jagir No. 6 Chak No. 11
 Jagir No. 6 Chak No. 12
 Jagir No. 6 Chak No. 13
 Jagir No. 6 Chak No. 14
 Jagir No. 6 Chak No. 15
 Jagir No. 6 Chak No. 16
 Jagir No. 6 Chak No. 17
 Jagir No. 6 Chak No. 18
 Jagir No. 6 Chak No. 19
 Jagir No. 6 Chak No. 20
 Jagir No. 6 Chak No. 21
 Jagir No. 6 Chak No. 22
 Jagir No. 6 Chak No. 23
 Jagir No. 6 Chak No. 24
 Jagir No. 6 Chak No. 25
 Jagir No. 6 Chak No. 26
 Jagir No. 6 Chak No. 27
 Jagir No. 6 Chak No. 28
 Jagir No. 6 Chak No. 29
 Jagir No. 6 Chak No. 30
 Jagir No. 6 Chak No. 31
 Jagir No. 6 Chak No. 32
 Jagir No. 6 Chak No. 33
 Jagir No. 6 Chak No. 34
 Jagir No. 6 Chak No. 35
 Jagir No. 6 Chak No. 36
 Jagir No. 6 Chak No. 37
 Jian Abro
 Juneja
 Kalar
 Kamal Khan
 Kanwar
 Kario Murad Ali
 Karohar
 Khabiriro
 Khahi Meehoon
 Khairpur Jusso
 Kohistan
 Koor Hassan
 Koor Kamal
 Koor Suleman
 Lakha
 Lakhtiya
 Lashkari Chandio
 Mahyoon
 Mena
 Mohabat Buledi
 Nangar Hakro
 Nathar
 Nouzman
 Pakho
 Panhwaro
 Peroz Bhatti
 Potho Ibrahim
 Puna
 Qambar
 Ranwati
 Rato Kot
 Sharifani
 Wadha
 Wakro
 Waryaso
 Warah Tehsil (42 Dehs)
 Chak Abad
 Warah
 Gaji khuhawr
 Miro Khan Tehsil (38 Dehs)
 Ali Sher Gopang
 Allah Bad
 Allah bux wadho
 Allah Rakhio
 Behram Hethyoon
 Behram Mathyon
 Bharmi
 Buthi
 Cheelo
 Chhajri
 Chori
 Chutto joyo
 Dhori Mubarak
 Dhori pir bux
 Dingri
 Drib Chandio
 Golo Khuhawar
 Jalal
 Kalhora
 Kallar daro Muqam
 Karam Ali Gopang
 Karera
 Kario Jam
 Khudi
 Koor Ali Khan
 Koor Ibrahim
 Koor Ismail
 Koor Muhbbat
 Mahmoon
 Misri Khan Chandio
 Pholro
 Qaim Gopang
 Rap
 Shah Ali Tunio
 Thareri Dhap
 Tharo Wadho
 Thull
 Vee
 Nasirabad Tehsil (23 Dehs)
 Adi Dhamrah
 Adi Lashari
 Ali Bahar
 Buth
 Buth dera
 Chinjni
 Chodero
 Dera
 Dhamrah
 Fekhrato
 Guko
 Gul Sangar
 Jalbani
 Kathia Bazar
 Khadhari
 Laiquepur
 Lakha
 Mangio
 Muradi
 Nasirabad
 Thariri Hashim
 Wahucha
 Wasu Kalhoro
 Qubo Saeed Khan Tehsil (38 Union councils)
 Bagodaro
 Bellati
 Dhoori
 Dur Mohammad
 Gada
 Hakra
 Hazarwah
 Imam Bux
 Ishaque
 Jagir
 Jamali
 Kamil
 Khokhar
 Khuhawar
 Kohistan
 Kot Shahbag
 Machi
 Mast Ali
 Mohammad Hassan
 Mugheri
 Pat No. 1
 Pat No. 2
 Pathuja
 Phalai
 Pir bux
 Qubo Saeed Khan
 Sadique
 Samander
 Sarhad
 Seer Chandia
 Seer dakhan
 Seer Jamali
 Seer Magsi
 Seer Settlement
 Shah Waryaso
 Trangra
 Waryal
 Zar
 Shahdadkot Tehsil (39 Dehs)
 Bhatti
 Bhurgeri
 Bhutta
 Chandia
 Choudha
 Dakhan
 Dhing
 Gahanwar
 Gopang
 Gurgaj
 Hameer
 Idden Jarwar
 Jari
 Jatoi
 Jhurir
 Juneja
 Kalar
 Kalhora, Shahdadkot, Qambar Shahdadkot
 Kario Ahmed Khan
 Kario Sobdar
 Khosa
 Koor Kari
 Kot Karira
 Kot Nabi Bux
 Leghari
 Magsi
 Markhand
 Meena
 Miro Khan
 Noor Pur
 Pathan
 Qutria
 Sando
 Sanjar Bhatti
 Seelra
 Shahdadkot
 Shaho Kamali
 Siyal
 Sukkur Jarwar
 Sijawal Junejo Tehsil (32 Dehs)
 Aalam Khan Junejo
 Arzi Bhutto
 Bakhsho Sario
 Belharo
 Chakar Suleman
 Chango
 Dhingano Mahesar
 Fateh Khan Dhamraho
 Fatuhal Chodo
 Ghulam Muhammad Leghari
 Gul Kalhoro
 Gul Shah
 Hayat Gopang
 Hyder Chandio
 Hyder Detho
 Jaleel Kalhoro
 Jiand Laak
 Kallar
 Kandi
 Kario Wah
 Khaliq Dino Dakhan
 Koor Sahab
 Korai
 Lal Khan Mastoi
 Lashkar Khan Chandio
 Mastoi
 Mohammad Gujrani
 Mohammadi Tanwari
 Saeed Khan Junejo
 Sher Khan
 Sijawal
 Soonharo Bhatto

References

Bibliography

 
Districts of Sindh